Locution can refer to:
 a figure of speech
 Locution (paranormal), a mode of supernatural revelation
 Locution (catchphrase), a particular word, phrase, or expression, especially associated with a particular person, region, group, or cultural level
 Interior locution, the phenomenon when a person reportedly receives a set of ideas, thoughts, or visions from an outside spiritual source

See also
 Locutionary act, the performance of an utterance in linguistics and the philosophy of mind.